Gladys May Aylward (24 February 1902 – 3 January 1970) was a British-born evangelical Christian missionary to China, whose story was told in the book The Small Woman, by Alan Burgess, published in 1957, and made into the film The Inn of the Sixth Happiness, starring Ingrid Bergman, in 1958. The film was produced by Twentieth Century Fox, and filmed entirely in North Wales and England.

Early life
Aylward was born in 1902, one of three children to Thomas John Aylward and Rosina Florence, a working-class family from Edmonton, North London. From her early teens, Gladys worked as a domestic worker (housemaid). Following a calling to go overseas as a Christian missionary, she was accepted by the China Inland Mission to study a preliminary three-month course for aspiring missionaries. Due to her lack of progress in learning the Chinese language she was not offered further training.

On 15 October 1930, having worked for Sir Francis Younghusband, Aylward spent her life savings on a train passage to Yangcheng, Shanxi Province, China. The perilous trip took her across Siberia with the Trans-Siberian Railway During a time when the Soviet Union and China were in an undeclared War.  She was detained by the Russians, but managed to evade them with local help and a lift from a Japanese ship. She travelled across Japan with the help of the British Consul and took another ship to China.

Work in China
On her arrival in Yangcheng China, Aylward worked with an older missionary, Jeannie Lawson, to found The Inn of the Eight Happinesses, ( bāfú kèzhàn in Chinese) the name based on the eight virtues: Love, Virtue, Gentleness, Tolerance, Loyalty, Truth, Beauty and Devotion. There, she and Mrs. Lawson not only provided hospitality for travellers, but would also share stories about Jesus, in hopes of spreading nascent Christianity. For a time she served as an assistant to the Government of the Republic of China as a "foot inspector" by touring the countryside to enforce the new law against footbinding young Chinese girls. She met with much success in a field that had produced much resistance, including sometimes violence against the inspectors.

Aylward became a national of the Republic of China in 1936 and was a revered figure among the people, taking in orphans and adopting several herself, intervening in a volatile prison riot and advocating prison reform, risking her life many times to help those in need. In 1938, the region was invaded by Japanese forces and Aylward led more than 100 orphans to safety over the mountains, despite being wounded, personally caring for them (and converting many to Christianity).

She did not return to Britain until 1949, at which point her life in China was thought to be in great danger from the Communists – the army was actively seeking out missionaries. Settling in Basingstoke, she gave many lectures on her work. After her mother died, Aylward sought a return to China. After rejection by the Communist government and a stay in British administered Hong Kong, she finally settled in Taiwan in 1958. There, she founded the Gladys Aylward Orphanage, where she worked until her death in 1970.

The Inn of the Sixth Happiness
A film based on her life, The Inn of the Sixth Happiness, was released in 1958. It drew from the book The Small Woman, by Alan Burgess. Although she found herself a figure of international interest due to the popularity of the film, and television and media interviews, Aylward was mortified by her depiction in the film and the liberties it took. The tall (1.75m/5' 9"), blonde, Swedish actress Ingrid Bergman was inconsistent with Aylward's small stature, dark hair and North London accent. The struggles of Aylward and her family to effect her initial trip to China were disregarded in favor of a movie plot device of an employer "condescending to write to 'his old friend' Jeannie Lawson." Also, Aylward's dangerous, complicated travels across Russia, China and Japan were reduced to, "a few rude soldiers", after which, "Hollywood's train delivered her neatly to Tientsin." Many characters and place names were changed, even when these names had significant meaning, such as those of her adopted children and the name of the inn, named instead for the Chinese belief in the number 8 as being auspicious. For example, in real life she was given the Chinese name  (Ài Wěi Dé- a Chinese approximation to 'Aylward' – meaning 'The Virtuous One'), but in the film she was given the name  Jen-Ai,( pronounced- Zhen-Ai, meaning "true love"). Colonel Linnan was portrayed as half-European, a change which she found insulting to his real Chinese lineage, and she felt her reputation was damaged by the Hollywood-embellished love scenes in the film. Not only had she never kissed a man, but the film's ending portrayed her character leaving the orphans to rejoin the colonel elsewhere, even though in reality she did not retire from working with orphans until she was 60 years old. She dedicated her life to the orphans in Taiwan, and was buried in Taipei. Her ministry continues to develop, and is now called Bethany Children's Home in Taipei, The new director, Sharon Chiang (Chinese: 江秀圈), is called from Seattle to further develop Bethany Children's Home for its new vision and new building.

Death and legacy
Aylward died on 3 January 1970, about a month and a half short of her 68th birthday, and is buried in a small cemetery on the campus of Christ's College in Guandu, New Taipei, Taiwan.

A London secondary school, formerly known as "Weir Hall and Huxley", was renamed the Gladys Aylward School shortly after her death.

There is a blue commemorative plaque on the house where Gladys lived near the school at 67 Cheddington Road, London N18.

A "house" was also named after Gladys Aylward at Fernwood Comprehensive (formerly Secondary Modern) school in Wollaton, Nottingham. 

Numerous books, short stories and films have been developed about the life and work of Gladys Aylward.

Notes

References
Hero Tales by Dave & Neta Jackson
These Are My People by Mildred T. Howard
The Woman with the Book by M. A. Mijnders-VanWoerden

Further sources

Archives
 The archive of Gladys Aylward, including artefacts from her time in China, is held by SOAS Special Collections. Digitised material from the collection is available to view online here .

Bibliography

Videography
The Inn of the Sixth Happiness (1958) – feature film
Gladys Aylward, the Small Woman with a Great God (2008) – documentary
Torchlighters: The Gladys Aylward Story (2008) – animated DVD for children ages 8–12

External links

Biography of Gladys Aylward
An anecdote on how the book came to be written
Photos of the Inn of Eight Happinesses at Yangcheng (2006)
Article on Llanelli Community Heritage with images

1902 births
1970 deaths
Burials in Taiwan
People from Edmonton, London
Female Christian missionaries
English Protestant missionaries
English humanitarians
English domestic workers
English evangelicals
Protestant missionaries in China
Christian missionaries in Taiwan
British expatriates in China
British emigrants to Taiwan